Ice Age: Dawn of the Dinosaurs (also known as Ice Age 3: Dawn of the Dinosaurs in PAL territories) is a 2009 platform game published by Activision. It is based on the film of the same name. The game was released on June 30, 2009 for the Xbox 360 (X360), Wii, PlayStation 2 (PS2), PlayStation 3 (PS3), Windows, and Nintendo DS. A demo was made available in the Xbox Live Marketplace on June 15, 2009 as well as a computer demo.

Gameplay
The game allows the player to take control of Manny, Sid, Scrat, Buck, Diego and Scratte as they take on or run away from dangerous dinosaurs, roll eggs to safety, chase for their beloved acorn and explore caves and jungles.

Reception

The game received "mixed or average" reviews from critics. Metacritic gave the Wii version a score of 75 out of 100 and the Xbox 360 version a 68 out of 100, while the PC and PlayStation 3 versions both received a 67 out of 100 and the Nintendo DS version received a 54 out of 100.

GameSpot gave both the PlayStation 3 and Xbox 360 versions a 6.5 out of 10, writing, "Ice Age may be kid-friendly, funny, and faithful to the movie, but it's also repetitive and over too quickly."

IGN also gave the game a 6.5 out of 10, writing, "A perfectly acceptable purchase; if you're a little kid."

Notes

References

External links

 

2009 video games
Activision games
Dinosaurs in video games
Nintendo DS games
Platform games
PlayStation 2 games
PlayStation 3 games
Video games based on films
Video games set in prehistory
Video games developed in the United Kingdom
Wii games
Windows games
Xbox 360 games
Ice Age (franchise) games
Blue Sky Studios video games
Eurocom games
Single-player video games
Behaviour Interactive games
Video games scored by Steve Duckworth
Video games scored by Jim Croft
Budcat Creations games
SuperVillain Studios games
3D platform games